The United States Senate's hideaways are about 100 secret offices in the U.S. Capitol building used by members of the Senate, and by a few senior members of the U.S. House of Representatives. Their locations are unlisted in any official directory and their doors are marked only by a room number. Hideaways are used by senators as a private space in which to prepare for sessions of the Senate, to conduct confidential meetings, to take naps, and for other personal purposes. They range from lavish and expansive upper-floor offices to small, cramped offices in the basement. Hideaways are assigned to senators based on seniority. The history of hideaways dates to the earliest occupancy of the U.S. Capitol in 1800. However, they proliferated in the early 20th century.

Background
Members of the United States Senate and their staff have office suites in either the Dirksen Senate Office Building, the Russell Senate Office Building, or the Hart Senate Office Building in Washington, D.C. In addition to these primary offices, however, Senators are each also allocated a single-room office in the United States Capitol, informally known as a hideaway.

History
Senate hideaways date to the earliest occupancy of the U.S. Capitol. When the Capitol opened in 1800, senators were assigned no work space other than their desks on the floor of the Senate chamber and so appropriated unused spaces throughout the complex. The opening of the Russell Senate Office Building in 1909, and the United States Supreme Court Building in 1935, resulted in the vacancy of additional space in the Capitol, where senators quickly started squatting.

Location and design
Hideaway offices are located on all four floors of the Capitol building, including the basement level. Many hideaways are located in what the Associated Press has described as "ancient nooks" of the centuries-old Capitol. Writing about Barbara Mikulski's hideaway, Politico described it as being in "an unmarked room accessed by corridors and staircases reminiscent of the ones that appear and disappear at Hogwarts". By the end of the 20th century there were about 75 hideaways, but in 2010, the number of hideaways was increased to 100 to accommodate all senators who wish to have one, after basement space opened up from the relocation of a Capitol police office into the newly opened Capitol Visitor Center.

Hideaways are assigned by the Senate Rules Committee based on seniority. The offices assigned to the most senior senators are often lush and expansive. The third floor "Kennedy Hideaway" – so-called as it was long occupied by Senator Edward Kennedy – is considered the most luxurious hideaway to occupy and, according to The Hill, is the "pinnacle of insider prestige". The unusually large space features a fireplace, arched ceilings, and a sweeping view of the National Mall, described by The Hill as being like an "upscale clubroom". The room is completely private, but easily accessible to both the Senate chambers and the press gallery. 

In 1991, the basement office of Jeff Bingaman, junior senator from New Mexico who ranked no. 63 on the Senate seniority list, consisted of "a low, fiberboard ceiling, a desk with a cheap office chair on rollers, a refrigerator, a cupboard, and a cot with no bedspread". Hideaway furniture is supplied by the sergeant at arms, although senators can move in their own furniture.

Hideaways that become vacant after an electoral defeat, or due to the death of a sitting senator, are reassigned at the beginning of each two-year Congressional term.

Use

Hideaways are used by senators to prepare for sessions of the Senate, to take naps, or to conduct private or confidential meetings. Senator Daniel Webster, senator from Massachusetts in the mid-19th century, stocked his hideaway with a private wine collection. Mid-20th century senator Allen J. Ellender of Louisiana installed a kitchen in his hideaway where he enjoyed cooking Creole dishes and praline candies. 

Hideaways have historically also been used by male members of the Senate to engage in private sexual liaisons with their mistresses. Bill Moyers recounts one instance of an unnamed senator "stashing" his mistress in a hideaway so well-hidden that it took him several hours to locate her again. During his tenure in the Senate, Lyndon Johnson amassed no fewer than five hideaways where he would receive women. Senator Bob Packwood of Oregon, meanwhile, is alleged to have sexually assaulted a woman in his hideaway.

Secrecy
The process for assigning hideaways is, according to The Hill, "secretive".  In 2015, a former aide to Harry Reid described that "it's all done by secret handshake. All of a sudden you're told you've got a hideaway and here are the keys". In 2011, when asked about his hideaway by a journalist, Orrin Hatch said he was "not allowed to talk about that". According to the Associated Press, none of several senatorial offices contacted for a 2010 story responded to requests for information about hideaways. The Architect of the Capitol, meanwhile, referred questions to the Senate Rules Committee which, in turn, also did not respond. 

The location of hideaways are unlisted in any official directory and their doors are marked only by a room number.  In some cases, members of the senator's own staff are unaware of the location of their hideaway.

Hideaways of the House of Representatives

While a few senior members of the U.S. House of Representatives also have hideaways, in general they are reserved for senators. The Speaker of the House has a hideaway traditionally occupied by the Speaker. The first-floor office is colloquially known as the "Board of Education room", though no entity by such a name has ever occupied the space. In 1945 Harry Truman, then serving as U.S. vice president, learned of the death of Franklin Roosevelt while being feted with afternoon cocktails in this hideaway, which was then occupied by Sam Rayburn.

In popular culture
In the book Woman First: First Woman, a companion work to the television series Veep, fictional former Senator Selina Meyer writes that "... by immemorial custom, a senator is never disturbed in his or her hide-away except in the case of a vote or a bomb threat. I readily adapted to the daily routine while the Senate was in session of napping in my hideaway when not voting or being evacuated".

See also
 Brumidi Corridors
 President's Room
 United States Capitol crypt

References

External links
"Inside a Senate Hideaway", Politico (January 5, 2015), showing the hideaway of former senator Barbara Mikulski

United States Senate
United States Capitol rooms